Phlebopteris is an extinct genus of Mesozoic fern belonging to the family Matoniaceae, it is diagnosed by "pinna exhibiting short or long pinnules with decurrent or non-decurrent base; midrib often reaching the apex; secondary veins dichotomously branched, with or without forming a reticulate venation; circular sori lacking indusium; sori with five to six annulate sporangia annulus; trilete, subtriangular, tetrahedral or round spores." The oldest fossil of the genus is known from the Ladinian of Italy. The genus was almost globally distributed during the Jurassic, with a concentration of species in the northern hemisphere. It probably preferred moist habitats.

References 

Gleicheniales
Prehistoric plant genera
Triassic plants
Jurassic plants
Cretaceous plants